Stefan Lenhart (born 1969) is a German artist based in Munich. His work is a mixture of sculpture, large scale installations and painting, often incorporating historical elements.

Life and education 
Stefan Lenhart studied at the Academy of Fine Arts, Munich, graduating in 2007.

Career 
In 2007, Lenhart founded the alternative art project space Tanzschuleprojects, which ran till 2012.  Notable exhibitions include the "Halbjahresgaben" series (2009-2011) which included work by Kalin Lindena, Daniel Man, Tim Bennett, Florian Meisenberg and Martin Wöhrl, and "Meisterwerke der Menschenheit" series (2007-2008) with Lone Haugaard Madsen and Claudia Wieser.

In 2015, he organised an Artist March in honour of the young artists who died in 1881 in what is known as the Eskimotragödie.
 
A recent retrospective of his work was hosted by the Kunstverein Ebensberg in 2018, featuring his older large scale work as well as his newer paintings. Another exhibition of his paintings, Trojan Horse Power took place at the Kunstverein Erlangen in 2019. Three recent series of paintings were shown in the exhibition Insider for Outsider at the Kunstverein Landshut in 2021.

A catalogue of his work, Melancholie al Dente, has been published by Distanz in 2012.

Exhibition list 
 2008   Who is Who, Galerie Carol Johnssen, München
 2009   Paradies, Diözesanmuseum, Freising
 2009   Dark Fair, Kölnischer Kunstverein, Köln
 2009   Kühle Analysen, Kunstmuseum, Celle
 2010   The eternal reoccurrence of everything, Spacework, Los Angeles
 2010   Ghosting the cities, Praterstr. 48, Wien
 2010   No soul for sale, Tate Modern, London
 2011   Ivorytowerclubmembers, Infernoesque, Berlin
 2012   Phantom Eldorado, Kunstverein Heppenheim
 2013   Konstrakt, Galerie Jahn, München
 2014   Immersion Pact 1 & 2, Platform, München
 2015   Germany, mon amour, Fondazione Giorgio Cini, Venedig
 2016   Anthophobia, Artothek, München
 2016   fruits of the dawn, GiG, München
 2018   Ghost Evacuation, Kunstverein Ebersberg
 2018   New Forms of Beauty, Smolka Contemporary, Wien
2019 Trojan horse Power, Kunstverein Erlangen
2021 Insider for Outside, Kunstverein Landshut

References

External links 
 
 Stefan Lenhart at Artitious

1969 births
Living people
21st-century German sculptors
21st-century German male artists
21st-century German painters
German male sculptors
German male painters
Academy of Fine Arts, Munich alumni
Artists from Munich